Newcastle General Hospital (NGH) was for many years the main hospital for the city of Newcastle upon Tyne, England, and is managed by Newcastle upon Tyne Hospitals NHS Foundation Trust. The Accident and Emergency Department and Intensive Care closed on 16 November 2010. A walk-in centre for minor ailments and injuries remained on the site.

History
The hospital was originally constructed as the infirmary for the Newcastle Union Workhouse. Building began in 1868 and it opened in 1870. In 1921 the administration of the hospital was separated from the Workhouse and the name was changed to the Wingrove Hospital.
In 1948 the name was changed to the Newcastle General Hospital when it became part of the National Health Service.

The Newcastle upon Tyne Hospitals NHS Foundation Trust reorganised the way it provided acute and tertiary health care in the city and most of the acute services at the hospital were moved to the Freeman Hospital and the Royal Victoria Infirmary between 2008 and 2010. The remaining land is being made available for commercial development, the building of a science park (as part of the Newcastle Science City initiative) and the further development of Newcastle University’s "Campus for Ageing and Vitality".

See also
 List of hospitals in England

References

External links
 NGH Details at the National Archives

Hospital buildings completed in 1870
Buildings and structures in Newcastle upon Tyne
Hospitals in Tyne and Wear
NHS hospitals in England
Teaching hospitals in England
1870 establishments in England
Hospitals established in 1870
Poor law infirmaries